Roadside Romeo is a 2008 3D computer animated musical romantic comedy film written and directed by Jugal Hansraj in his directorial debut., produced by Aditya Chopra and Yash Chopra of Yash Raj Films and distributed by Walt Disney Studios Motion Pictures in the United States, the United Kingdom and India. The film follows a dog living in Mumbai, voiced by Saif Ali Khan, and his girlfriend, Laila, voiced by Kareena Kapoor. This was the first voice-over in an animated film for both actors.

It was released on 24 October 2008 in the United States and India. This was the second Bollywood film to receive a North American release by a Hollywood studio, following Sony Pictures' Saawariya (2007). The film received generally negative reviews from critics, with most of the criticism focused on the film's script, predictable plot, Hansraj's direction and overuse of cliches.

Plot
Romeo is a dog who once lived in luxurious surroundings. One day his owners decide to migrate to London and he is left at the mercy of the servant of the house, who dumps him on the streets of Mumbai. Left to fend for himself, he is soon cornered by the local gang – Guru, Interval, Hero English and a dog-wannabe-cat, Mini, who tell him that this is their domain. Romeo does not know the street lingo and is at a loss for words at first, but he manages to win the gang over with giving them haircuts. They love their new looks and accept Romeo as part of their gang. Together, they set up a successful dog-grooming business until Chhainu, the right-hand of gangster-dog Charlie Anna, arrives to collect "weeklies" (weekly protection money) in the form of bones. Romeo throws Chhainu out, and the others, terrified, go to Charlie to plead their case. Charlie threatens them with his trio of female ninja dogs, whom he calls his Angels, but Romeo tricks Charlie into allowing his friends to leave unhurt.

Romeo then meets Laila, who is singing from a rooftop, they dance and he falls in love. To win her over, Laila tells Romeo he must dance with her in front of everyone at the "Moonlight Club" where she performs. Romeo says yes, unaware that Charlie has long wanted her, and anyone who dares go near her is punished. However, Romeo braves the odds and dances with Laila to win her heart. As Laila starts falling in love with him, Charlie, in a fit of rage, captures and terrorizes Romeo. Romeo then promises that he would make Laila fall in love with Charlie. Romeo does not intend to lose Laila but plans to deflate Charlie's ego by having a disguised Mini pretend to be Laila and make it clear she's not interested. This only ends up exacerbating Charlie's ire, and Romeo promises him a second meeting with Leila.

The night of the appointment, however, Chhainu catches Romeo kissing Laila, who then shouts at Romeo telling Laila of Romeo's deal with Charlie and she angrily and violently slaps him and after she sees what Romeo had done says she never wants to see him again despite Romeo's pleas for forgiveness. In a pursuit, Charlie's Angels are wooed by Guru, Interval and Hero English, Chhainu is cornered by a mouse (and smashed with a "jumbo jet") and Charlie is chased and caught by the city dogcatchers. But just before Charlie is caught with a net, Romeo pushes him under the dog-catchers van to escape while Romeo goes, Charlie then convinces Guru, Hero English, Interval and Mini to create a distraction to get the guard away from the van, they all succeed and Charlie jumps on the van and says he will free Romeo using a pin in his chain to pick the lock, but the van begins to drive and he falls off, after which Charlie races after the van, losing the pin in the progress, but thankfully one of Charlie's ear hairs suffice.

They escape but Romeo feels there is no point staying as Laila said she never wanted to see him again, and Charlie badly wants her. The next morning, Romeo throws his sack onto an open train boxcar about to leave the station but Charlie arrives with Laila and the others. Charlie tells Romeo that he is a fool for leaving Laila when she still loves him, that he explained everything to her and says she is Romeo's and no one else's. He lets go of her hand and Laila begins to run after the train, while Romeo holds his hand out for her. Resembling a famous scene from Dilwale Dulhania Le Jayenge, Charlie remarks "Where have I seen this before?". She reaches for his hand and grabs it but the handle Romeo was holding had lost its top screws, making him fall off with Laila, after which they raise their heads to each other and say "I love you" in sync. It then goes to the "Moonlight Club" where everyone is back singing a reprise of "Main Hoon Romeo" in party-remix.

Voice cast
 Saif Ali Khan as Romeo, a Golden retriever mix the former dog of a rich family. 
 Kareena Kapoor as Laila, a beautiful white female Afghan hound and Romeo's love interest. 
 Javed Jaffrey as Charlie Anna, an obese bulldog who is the Don of the slum.
 Vrajesh Hirjee as Guru, a Bull terrier who is the oldest and wisest among the four goons.
 Kiku Sharda as Hero English, a Siberian husky the second member of the gang.
 Suresh Menon as Interval, a koolie who is the third member of the gang.
 Tannaz Irani as Mini, a tabby cat who is the final member of the gang, who is actually a girl.
 Sanjay Mishra as Chhainu, a wolf who is Charlie Anna's spy.

Production
As a fan of animation, Jugal Hansraj teamed up with Aditya Chopra to write their first cartoon. Nothing came of the collaboration, the writer/director recalls, "till this one day, I was waiting at the traffic signal and saw these dogs playing in the dirt... un-cared for, scruffy looking gang, totally mast in a garbage pile, and I instantly knew the characters of my story." The alliance by producer Yash Chopra and Disney chairman Dick Cook is a first in the field of animation. This also is the first mainstream CGI feature film to come out of India. Visual Computing Labs (VCL), a division of Tata Elxsi Ltd in Bangalore, was involved with everything from visual conceptualisation, character design to animation and final output. Production commenced in January 2007, continuing for two and a half years and involved 150 crew members; twenty-one months were spent on the animation. while the studio's IT Engineers developed 1,400 shots was rendered on Autodesk Flame on a dual-processor digital pipeline equipped by the fastest supercomputers at the time. While the film's animation was handled in Maya final color grade was performed by Prime Focus Technologies, using Lustre.  

It also benefited from the use of Tata Elxsi's EKA, That the company did not publicly release the film's budget, Britain's Guardian reported it to be about US$7 million. The first trailer, shown on 12 October 2007 with the release of the film Laaga Chunari Mein Daag, shows the film's crew holding an audition for Romeo; another trailer was later shown with Laila's audition
. Though the release was originally scheduled for the summer of 2008, the release was put off to Diwali. The costumes for the lead characters were made at Walt Disney World in Orlando, Florida for the film's Indian promotion. Yash Raj Films worked with Hot Muggs for producing licensed merchandise for the film. Hot Muggs integrated an inaugural concept of incorporating one-liners from the movie like "Tension Not," "Stay Cool" and "I'm Good Na" on coffee mugs. Though many Bollywood actors promoted the film, the two main stars of Romeo, Saif Ali Khan and Kareena Kapoor Khan did not do much promotion. Kapoor told the producers she would be busy promoting her other Diwali release, Golmaal Returns. Khan simply made himself inaccessible.

The film's official website was shown on 16 October 2008.

Reception

Box office
Yash Raj Films, for the first time ever, held a pre-release screening for film exhibitors on 18 October 2008. It was then released exclusively across local multiplexes on 24 October 2008. During the weekend of its release, the film faced competition from Heroes, hence it opened to a poor response of 40- 45%, which improved two days later to 60–70%. Its first-week gross of Rs. 45 million (US$912,316) made it an Indian record for a Disney production. The film was declared disaster at the Indian box office. In the United States and Canada, the film debuted in as many as 40 theatres on the same day. On the first weekend, it made US$41,770 (Rs. 2,080,000) and placed 49th. The following week, its gross income came to US$55,202. The film opened with similar results in 23 British theatres, grossing £31,576 (Rs. 2,470,000). The movie fared poorly in Australia with an income of only US$13,233 (Rs. 652,000) from 9 venues; and in New Zealand it brought in US$604 (Rs. 29,792) from 2 venues. In Kuwait, the film opened on 23 October 2008 and grossed US$14,549 in the first week.

Critical response
 Taran Adarsh gave the film three stars out of five, citing its borrowing from the masala films of 1980s and a predictable story. Another factor he said went against the film was its lack of good music. Though the title track and "Chhoo Le Na" were publicised, they lacked impact. Though the film was targeted at children, he said Charlie Anna's south Indian accent was hard to decipher and comprehend even for adults. Despite the drawbacks, he cited the animation's good quality which could even be compared to international standards. The New York Times criticised the movie saying, "The animated dogs in Romeo aren’t particularly appealing. They mostly walk on two legs and, unlike Disney characters, don’t wear anything beyond neck gear. They look oddly naked and move awkwardly, which flattens the dance sequences and keeps the film earthbound." Raja Sen's two star review for Rediff.com stated "This is a well-animated movie with finely detailed backgrounds, and despite a lack of overall consistency, Roadside Romeo looks nice, bright and shiny enough to ensure kids are drawn to it. So well done, animators and debutant director Jugal Hansraj -- the look works."

Music

The film's soundtrack was released on 1 October 2008 by director Jugal Hansraj and actor Jaaved Jaffrey at The Club in Andheri, Mumbai. The music was composed by Salim-Sulaiman, and lyrics have been penned by Jaideep Sahni. Joginder Tuteja from indiaFM gave the film's soundtrack 2 out of 5 stars and noted, "The songs in themselves are no great shakes and, except for a track or two, the remaining just passes muster. [The] Delayed release of the album would take a further toll on the sales of Roadside Romeo. Overall, Roadside Romeo is a barely an okay album where one's hope only rests on the state of art animation (as promised by the makers)."

Awards

See also
 Indian animation industry
 List of Indian animated feature films
 List of Disney theatrical animated features
 List of Walt Disney Pictures films

References

External links

 
 
 
 
 
 

2008 films
2008 computer-animated films
2000s Hindi-language films
2000s musical films
2008 romantic comedy films
Animated romance films
American computer-animated films
American children's animated comedy films
American children's animated musical films
Animated films about dogs
Indian animated films
Films set in Mumbai
Yash Raj Films films
Walt Disney Pictures animated films
Disney India films
Best Animated Feature Film National Film Award winners
Indian musical films
Indian children's films
2000s American films